The Goffs Schoolhouse is a historic school building located at 37198 Lanfair Road in Goffs, California. Opened in 1914, the one-room schoolhouse was the first in Goffs used solely as a school; prior to its construction, the school district had used a rented building. Architect Anthony Beimer designed the Mission Revival building. The district served students in a  region surrounding Goffs; its students were the children of the area's miners and railroad workers. Many of the students came from Mexican immigrant families, and bilingual students often served as teacher's assistants to translate for the teacher. Goffs residents also used the school building as a community center, and it housed a branch of the San Bernardino County Library. The school closed in 1937, when the Goffs School District merged with the Needles district. During World War II, the school building served as a canteen for the Desert Training Center, the largest Army training facility in the United States. The Mojave Desert Heritage and Cultural Association now uses the building as a museum and cultural center.

The school was added to the National Register of Historic Places on October 11, 2001.

References

External links
 Mojave Desert Heritage and Cultural Association
 Goffs Schoolhouse - history article in Desert USA

School buildings on the National Register of Historic Places in California
Mission Revival architecture in California
Buildings and structures in San Bernardino County, California
Education in San Bernardino County, California
One-room schoolhouses in California
Museums in San Bernardino County, California
History museums in California
National Register of Historic Places in San Bernardino County, California
1914 establishments in California